Bradley Adam Thiessen is an American statistician and academic administrator serving as the interim president of the New College of Florida. He is the chief of staff and a professor of statistics.

Life 
Theissen earned a bachelor's degree in secondary mathematics education at the St. Ambrose University. He earned a master's degree and Ph.D. in educational measurement and statistics from the University of Iowa. His 2008 dissertation was titled, Relationship between test security policies and test score manipulations. Timothy Neri Ansley was his doctoral advisor.

Thiessen worked at the St. Ambrose University for 12 years as the university assessment coordinator and a faculty member in the department of mathematics and statistics. He joined the New College of Florida in July 2016 as the president's chief of staff and a professor of statistics. In August 2016, he became its first director of institutional performance assessment. On January 2, 2020, he became the director of institutional research at the University of Hawaiʻi at Hilo. On January 31 2023, Thiessen was appointed as the interim president of the New College of Florida by the board of trustees, succeeding Patricia Okker. He will serve until March 2023 when he is replaced by Richard Corcoran.

References 

Living people
Year of birth missing (living people)
Place of birth missing (living people)
American statisticians
St. Ambrose University alumni
University of Iowa alumni
St. Ambrose University faculty
University of Hawaiʻi faculty
Presidents of New College of Florida
21st-century American mathematicians
Mathematicians from Iowa